Bernd Altenstein (born 29 April 1943) is a German Sculptor and University lecturer.

Life
Altenstein was born in Schlossberg, East Prussia. He studied Art in Stuttgart and worked at the University of the Arts in Bremen from 1975 to 2009. His sculpture is available at various public locations in Germany.

A bronze sculpture Fietje Balge, commissioned by Bankhaus Carl F. Plump & Co., was erected in the street Hinter dem Schütting in memory of the Balge river and its harbour]. A nearby plaque explains the history of the Balge.

Works

The trapped, bronze sculpture, Osnabrück c.1974
The end, bronze sculpture, Bremen 1978
Development, fountain sculpture in bronze, Bremen 1980
Waller talks, three bronze half-figures, Bremen 1981
Man at the desk, bronze sculpture in a courtyard, Göttingen 1984
Work, inside the main post office building, Bremen 1985
Citizens, Russian Knoops Park, Burglesum 1987
The dance ', bronze sculpture, Göttingen 1988
Four Seasons, bronze, sculptural ensemble in Citizens Park, Bremen 1991
Convalescents, Bronze, Sculpture in the Park of the Hospital, Bremen 1991
Jakobsbrunnen group of pilgrims, St. James Church, Augsburg 1994
Our planet, bronze fountain sculpture on the Domshof, Bremen, 1996
Fietje bellows, bronze figure, Bremen 2001

Further reading
 (Bremen Sculpture School) Die Bremer Bildhauerschule. Figur zwischen Fundament und Fundamentalismus. Ausst. Kat. Gerhard Marcks House, Bremen 2004.

References

1943 births
Living people
German sculptors
German male sculptors